Kehrer is a rare German surname native to the mountain areas of Switzerland, Bavaria and Saxony. Etymologically, it appears to be a topographical name meaning "someone living by a bend in a road". In modern German it means a "cleaner" and this is assumed by some to be its origin as an occupational name. Notable people with the surname include:

 Christian Wilhelm Karl Kehrer (b.1775 d.1869), German court painter and archivist.
 Elisabeth Kehrer (b.1961), Austrian diplomat.
 Ferdinand Adolf Kehrer (b.1837 d.1914), German inventor of the modern Caesarean section.
 Gerd Kehrer (b.1939), German painter.
  (b.1876 d.1967), German art historian.
 Jürgen Kehrer (b.1956), German writer.
 Karl Christian Kehrer (b.1755 d.1833), German portrait painter. 
 Klaus Kehrer (f.1995+), German book publisher.
 Rudolf Kehrer (b.1923 d.2013), Georgian classical pianist.
 Stefan Kehrer (b.1985), German wrestler. 
 Thilo Kehrer (b.1996), German soccer player.

German-language surnames